The men's 90 kg weightlifting competitions at the 1968 Summer Olympics in Mexico City took place on 18 October at the Teatro de los Insurgentes. It was the fifth appearance of the middle heavyweight class.

Results

References

Weightlifting at the 1968 Summer Olympics